Michael Dalton may refer to:

Michael Dalton (legal writer) (1564–1644), English barrister
Michael Dalton (gambler) (born 1955), gambling author, publisher and blackjack player
Michael Dalton (footballer) (1875–1933), Australian rules footballer
Michael Dalton (priest) (1902–2009), Canadian Roman Catholic military chaplain in World War II

See also
Mike Dalton (disambiguation)